The 2016 IBSF World Under-21 Snooker Championship was an amateur snooker tournament that took place from 20 August to 25 August 2016 in Mol, Belgium. It was the 28th edition of the IBSF World Under-21 Snooker Championship and also doubles as a qualification event for the World Snooker Tour.

The tournament was won by 25th seed Xu Si who defeated former world number 102 Alexander Ursenbacher 6–5 in the final. As a result, Xu Si was given a two-year card on the professional World Snooker Tour for the 2017/2018 and 2018/2019 seasons.

Results

Round 1
Best of 7 frames

Round 2
Best of 7 frames

References

2016 in snooker
Snooker amateur tournaments
Mol, Belgium
2016 in Belgian sport
International sports competitions hosted by Belgium